Valladolises y Lo Jurado is a village and a district in Murcia, Spain. It is part of the municipality of Murcia. Valladolises y Lo Jurado is located in the south end and shares borders with Fuente Álamo de Murcia in its south. The district has an area of 42.614 km2 and was inhabited by 775 people in 2020.

Demographics 
38.27% inhabitants are foreigners – 2.448% come from other country of Europe, 27.34% are Africans, and 8.21% are Americans. The table below shows the population trends of the Valladolises y Lo Jurado in the 21st century by its five-year periods.

Notes and references 

Populated places in the Region of Murcia